Kayalum Kayarum is a 1979 Indian Malayalam film,  directed by K. S. Gopalakrishnan and produced by M. S. Sivaswami. The film stars Madhu, Jayabharathi, Mohan Sharma and KPAC Lalitha in the lead roles. The film has musical score by K. V. Mahadevan.

Cast

Madhu as Chellappan
Jayabharathi as Jaanu
Mohan Sharma as Raghavan
KPAC Lalitha as Panki
P. C. George as Gunda
Adoor Bhavani as Devaki
Anandavally as Daisy
K. P. A. C. Azeez as Kaduva Narayanan
Bahadoor as Vasu Pillechan
KPAC Sunny as Johnny
Kottarakkara Sreedharan Nair as Raghavan's father
Kuthiravattam Pappu as Purushu
Nellikode Bhaskaran as Aadurahuman
Vanchiyoor Madhavan Nair as Joseph Muthalali
Vanchiyoor Radha as Meenakshi

Soundtrack
The music was composed by K. V. Mahadevan and the lyrics were written by Poovachal Khader.

References

External links
 

1979 films
1970s Malayalam-language films
Films scored by K. V. Mahadevan